The 1944 Appalachians tornado outbreak was a deadly tornado outbreak that hit the Midwest and Mid-Atlantic regions of the United States on June 22–23, 1944. The outbreak produced several strong tornadoes in Pennsylvania, West Virginia, and Maryland—areas that were falsely believed to be immune to tornadoes. Particularly hard hit was the town of Shinnston in Harrison County, West Virginia, which was destroyed by a violent F4 tornado before 9:00 PM EDT on June 23. A total of 30 people died at Shinnston and at least 104 were killed in the state of West Virginia by this and two other intense tornadoes. The outbreak itself was and still remains the deadliest tornado outbreak ever to hit the state of West Virginia. The Shinnston tornado was and is the only tornado to produce violent damage in West Virginia.

Meteorological synopsis

Confirmed tornadoes

June 23 event

See also 
 List of North American tornadoes and tornado outbreaks

References

Bibliography

External links 
 Tornado damage images in Dravosburg, Pennsylvania
 The Monessen Daily Independent front page tornado article (June 24, 1944, edition)

F4 tornadoes by date
Appalachians,1944-06-22
Appalachians,1944-06-22
Tornadoes in West Virginia
Tornadoes in Pennsylvania
Tornadoes in Maryland
Tornadoes in Ohio
Appalachians Tornado Outbreak
Appalachians tornado outbreak